Quick as a Flash was a 30-minute radio quiz program which featured drama segments with guest actors from radio detective shows.

Created by director Richard Lewis and emcee Ken Roberts, the program debuted over the Mutual Network on Sunday, July 16, 1944. Sponsored by the Helbros Watch Company, the show was produced by Lewis and Bernard J. Prockter with scripts by Gene Wang. Music was by Ray Bloch and the Helbros Orchestra.

Six contestants from the studio audience competed for cash and other prizes. Clues were presented in the form of dramatic sketches covering such subjects as current events, movies, books and historical situations. With a buzzer, a contestant could interrupt at any time to submit an answer.

During the Helbros Derby, a guest detective from a radio mystery program put in an appearance. Frank Gallop and Win Elliott were announcers.

The series ended on June 29, 1951. Approximately one year later, the series made an attempt to go on television.

Television
The show's pilot was filmed in 1952 for NBC and hosted by Bill Cullen.

The series ran on ABC from March 12 to July 2, 1953 and again from September 10, 1953 to February 25, 1954. The series was hosted by Bobby Sherwood from March to May 1953, after which he was replaced by Bud Collyer.

References

External links
 "Guest Detectives" by Karl Schadow. Radio Recall, December 2005

1940s American radio programs
1950s American radio programs
1953 American television series debuts
1954 American television series endings
1940s American game shows
1950s American game shows
American radio game shows
American Broadcasting Company original programming
Mutual Broadcasting System programs
ABC radio programs